The Chinese Institute of Certified Public Accountants or CICPA is a professional accounting organization based in Beijing with oversight responsibility for accountants in China.

The Chinese Institute of Certified Public Accountants (CICPA) is an organization under the guidance of the Ministry of Finance and the State Council. Founded in November 1988 in accordance with The Law of the People’s Republic of China for Certified Public Accountants and The Regulations for the Registration and Administration of Social Organizations, the CICPA exercises the professional management and service functions by virtue of the powers vested in The Law of the People’s Republic of China for Certified Public Accountants, stipulated by The Charter of the Chinese Institute of Certified Public Accountants and the duties assigned by the Ministry of Finance.

Presidents 
 Yang Jiwan (Professor), (楊紀琬), founding president.

Duties and responsibilities 
To examine and approve applications for CICPA membership, and provide guidance to the local institutes of CPAs on membership registration;
To develop professional standards and rules for CPAs, monitor and review their implementation;
To conduct annual quality assurance program for individual CPA sand accounting firms;
To formulate professional regulatory rules and take disciplinary actions against those with non-compliant activities;
To organize National Unified CPA Examinations;
To organize and deliver training programs for members;
To organize professional exchanges, conduct theoretical research and provide technical support;
To give publicity to the accountancy profession;
To promote relationships within and beyond the accountancy profession, support CPAs to adhere to the laws in conducting their practices and safeguard the legitimate rights and interests of members;
To represent the Chinese accountancy profession in carrying out international co-operations and exchanges;
To give guidance to the work of local institutes of CPAs;
To conduct other relevant work stipulated by laws and regulations, and entrusted or authorized by government agencies.

Structure 
The highest authority of the CICPA is the National Assembly of Delegates, through which the Council is elected. The Council elects a President, a certain number of Deputy Presidents and the Executive Committee. Special Committees and Professional Committees are set up under the Council. The Executive Committee exercises the powers and duties of the Council when the Council is not in session. The secretariat is the operational office of the CICPA.

So far, there are 12 Special Committees and 1 Professional Committee under the Council. The Special Committees include the Strategy Committee, the Information Committee, the Auditing Standards Committee, the Code of Ethics Committee, the Finance Committee, the Disciplinary Committee, the Appeal and Member Rights Committee, the Education and Training Committee, the Registration Administration Committee, the Practicing Liability Appraisal Committee, the Steering Committee for Governance of Accounting Firms, the Editorial Committee of The Chinese CPA Magazine and the Professional and Technical Guidance Committee.

Institute Secretariat 
The CICPA secretariat has 14 departments, including 2 General Offices, Examination Department (also the Office of the CPA Examination Committee of the Ministry of Finance), Registration Department, Continuing Professional Development Department, Quality Assurance Department, Professional Standards and Technical Guidance Department, Research and Development Department, International Affairs Department, Finance Department, Editorial Office of Chinese CPA Magazine, Information Technology Department, Human Resources Department and Administration Department

Development 
By 31 October 2010, CICPA has 7,790 group members (accounting firms, including 779 branches), nearly 180,000 individual members, with 95,378 practicing members and over 83,000 non-practicing members. There are about 300,000 accounting professionals and providing services for more than 3.5 million enterprises.

Membership within the International Accounting Federations 
CICPA became a member of the Confederation of Asian and Pacific Accountants (CAPA) and the International Federation of Accountants (IFAC) in October 1996 and May 1997 respectively, and has developed friendly cooperation and communications with more than 50 professional accountancy organizations in other jurisdictions.

See also
 China Accounting Standards (CAS)
 Insurance industry in China

External links
 CICPA 

Accounting in China
Organizations established in 1988
Organizations based in Beijing
1998 establishments in China
Member bodies of the International Federation of Accountants